Ivan Ribar (21 January 1881 – 2 February 1968) was a Croatian politician who served in several governments of various forms in Yugoslavia. Ideologically a Pan-Slavist and communist, he was a prominent member of the Yugoslav Partisans, who resisted the Nazi occupation of Yugoslavia.

Biography
Ribar was born in Vukmanić (part of Karlovac) and held a PhD in law. He worked as an attorney in Zagreb, Đakovo and Belgrade.

Ribar lost his entire family during World War II: his two sons, Ivo "Lola" and Jurica, and his wife Antonija. Both Ivo and Jurica were killed in action in 1943 fighting for the Partisans, while Ribar's wife was executed by the Germans in 1944. Ivo, his older son, was in charge of the Young Communist League of Yugoslavia (SKOJ) during the war, and was proclaimed posthumously a People's Hero of Yugoslavia.

Politics
In politics, he was: President of the Parliamentary Assembly of Kingdom of Serbs, Croats and Slovenes (1920–22) President of Executive Committee, Anti-Fascist Council for the National Liberation of Yugoslavia (26 October 1942 – 4 December 1943), Chairman of the Presidium of the Provisional People's Assembly (4 December 1943 – 5 March 1945), Chairman of the Presidium of the National Assembly (29 December 1945 – 14 January 1953)

From the proclamation of a republic in 1945 until 1953, Ribar was the de jure head of state of Yugoslavia; his position as parliamentary speaker was constitutionally made equivalent to that of president. In 1953, Communist Party leader and Prime Minister Josip Broz Tito, the country's de facto leader since 1945, was elected to the new post of President of the Republic.

Second marriage and death
Ribar spent his last years in Zagreb. In 1952 he married painter and poet Cata Dujšin-Ribar and moved into her flat on 3 Demeter Street. He died in 1968, aged 87. In 1976, his widow donated their flat and their art collection to the City of Zagreb. The art collection is exhibited at the Demeter Street flat, which is open to public. As of 2021, the flat is temporarily closed due to damage from the 2020 Zagreb earthquake.

See also
List of honorary citizens of Skopje

Notes

References

External links

1881 births
1968 deaths
People from Karlovac
People from the Kingdom of Croatia-Slavonia
Democratic Party (Yugoslavia) politicians
League of Communists of Croatia politicians
Representatives in the Croatian Parliament (1848–1918)
Yugoslav Partisans members
Croatian atheists
Burials at Mirogoj Cemetery
Recipients of the Order of the Hero of Socialist Labour